Yreka High School is a public high school in Yreka, California, United States. It was founded in 1893.

History
The school burned down in 1916 and was rebuilt as a two-story structure in 1918.

Notable alumni
Ray Coleman, Major League Baseball player
Dave Bennett, Major League Baseball player
Dennis Bennett, Major League Baseball player

References

External links

Educational institutions established in 1893
Public high schools in California
1893 establishments in California
Schools in Siskiyou County, California